Merpanaikadu  is a village in the Aranthangirevenue block of Pudukkottai district, Tamil Nadu, India.

Demographics 

As per the 2001 census, Merpanaikadu had a total population of 6732 with 3267 males and 3465 females. Out of the total population 4328 people were literate.

References

Villages in Pudukkottai district